Two half-hitches is a type of knot, specifically a binding knot or hitch knot. One variety consists of an overhand knot tied around a post, followed by a half-hitch. This knot is less often referred to as a clove hitch over itself, double half-hitch, or full-hitch.

The following three-step process for tying the two half-hitches is also explained in the image gallery below.  Click on the images for high-resolution versions.
 Begin by forming a clockwise loop around the pole, with the working end of the rope on top.  Bring the working end through the loop.  At this point, you have an overhand knot around the pole.
Bring the working end down and to the left.  Loop it under the standing end.  Pull the working end through the loop just formed, tighten, and slide the knot along the standing end up to the post.  
A correctly tied two half-hitches resembles a clove hitch tied around the standing end of the line, not a cow hitch.  

To release the knot, pry apart the two hitches with a bending motion. However, it can often be difficult to untie. To help avoid this problem, tie a slipped variation: in the second half-hitch, pass through a bight, as when tying your shoe, rather than the entire free end.

Ashley Lesson #1781 has quotations on using two half-hitches for safety:
"Two half hitches will never slip"—Admiral Luce.
"Two half hitches saved a Queen's Ship"—Anonymous.
"Three half hitches are more than a King's Yacht wants"—Admiral Smyth.

See also
 List of hitch knots
 List of knots

References

External links
Roper's Knots

Hitch knots

de:Rundtörn mit zwei halben Schlägen